Urdu Hall is an Urdu language promotion institution located in Hyderabad, India. It has a library and archives of old Urdu literature.

Urdu Hall was inaugurated by Independent India's first Prime Minister, Pandit Jawaharlal Nehru in December 1955 at Himayathnagar, Hyderabad. Noted Urdu poet, Makhdoom Mohiuddin was associated with the center.

The Center
A chapter of Anjuman Taraqui Urdu is located here. There is a day and evening college running on its premises.

References

Urdu
Organisations based in Hyderabad, India
Organizations established in 1955
Indian writers' organisations
Language advocacy organizations
1955 establishments in India